Catherine Chauvel is a geochemist at the Institut de Physique du Globe de Paris known for her research on the impact of volcanic activity on the chemistry of the mantle, continental crust, and island arc geochemistry.

Education and career 

Chauvel has earned her Ph.D. in geochemistry in 1982 working with Bor-ming Jahn at the University of Rennes. Following her Ph.D., Chauvel was a postdoctoral investigator at the Max Plank Institute in Mainz, Germany from 1982 until 1990. In 1990 she began a French National Centre for Scientific Research (CNRS) position at the University of Rennes where she was promoted to Directeur de Recherche in 1998. From 1999 until 2017, she was at the University Grenoble Alpes in Grenoble, and in 2018 she moved to Institut de Physique du Globe de Paris.

In 2011, Chauvel was elected a fellow of the American Geophysical Union who cited her "for key contributions to understanding mantle evolution by isotope studies of oceanic basalts and linking subducted sediments to arc magmas". From 2015 until 2015, Chauvel was the president of the Volcanology, Geochemistry, and Petrology section of the American Geophysical Union. Starting in 2014, Chauvel has served as one of the editors-in-chief for the journal Chemical Geology.

Research 
Chauvel uses geochemistry to examine how terrestrial rocks are formed, and the long-term changes in the mantle and crust. Her Ph.D. research examined neodymium and strontium isotopes and trace elements in the Massif Central, in France. Her subsequent research used neodymium isotopes to date continental crust in Canada and komatiites at Kambalda, Western Australia. In French Polynesia, Chauvel linked multiple components of the mantle to define processes happening beneath the surface. On mid-ocean ridges, Chauvel has examined the movement of lead within the oceanic crust. Chauvel's research using hafnium and neodymium isotopes in oceanic basalt determined the composition of material which is recycled in the subsurface. Following the April 2019 fire at Notre Dame, Chauvel was part of the group that used lead levels in honey to track the fallout from the burned material. The lead concentrations were higher in the down wind areas, and lead isotopes tagged the lead as originating from the fire and not other potential sources of pollutants.

Selected publications

Awards and honors 
 Fellow, American Geophysical Union (2011)
 Fellow, European Association of Geochemistry and Geochemical Society (2017)
 Daly lecture, American Geophysical Union (2017)

References

External links 
 

Fellows of the American Geophysical Union
Living people
Women geochemists
French geochemists
University of Rennes alumni